The Grand Forks Border Bruins are a junior ice hockey team based in Grand Forks, British Columbia, Canada. They are members of the Neil Murdoch Division of the Kootenay Conference of the Kootenay International Junior Hockey League (KIJHL). They play their home games at the Jack Goddard Memorial Arena.

History
Of the five original teams that joined the KIJHL in 1969, the Grand Forks Border Bruins are the only team that has been a member since the beginning 49 years ago.  They paid their membership dues, for both LOA, therefore still had a vote and were in good standing.  

The 2015-16 KIJHL season marked the first time the Border Bruins made the playoffs in 18 seasons, defeating the Castlegar Rebels 4-2 in the Division Semifinals.

As of June 1st, 2021 the Grand Forks Border Bruins transferred ownership entering into private enterprise. They are currently owned and operated by Dr. Mark Szynkaruk a local physician in the community of Grand Forks B.C.

Season-by-season record

Note: GP = Games played, W = Wins, L = Losses, T = Ties, OTL = Overtime Losses, Pts = Points, GF = Goals for, GA = Goals against

Records as of February 27, 2023.

Playoffs

NHL alumni

Ron Areshenkoff
Rudy Poeschek
Alan Kerr
Craig Redmond
Glenn Merkosky
Kevin Sawyer
Steve Passmore
Mitch Fritz
Neil Eisenhut

Awards and trophies

Most Sportsmanlike
Craig Materi: 2004-2005
Neil Eisenhut - 1984-85

Most Popular
Kelly English - 1994-95

Most Valuable Player
Peter Smith - 2008-Present

References

External links
 Official website of the Grand Forks Border Bruins

Ice hockey teams in British Columbia
1969 establishments in British Columbia
Ice hockey clubs established in 1969
Boundary Country